Mahmood Hussain (2 April 1932 – 25 December 1991) was a Pakistani cricketer who played in 27 Test matches from 1952 to 1962. He was a fast medium bowler who partnered with Fazal Mahmood after Khan Mohammad retired from Test cricket. He made an unforgettable 35 at the Ferozshah Kotla, New Delhi in 1961, which saved Pakistan from certain defeat.

External links

1932 births
1991 deaths
Pakistani cricketers
Pakistan Test cricketers
Karachi cricketers
Pakistan Universities cricketers
Punjab University cricketers
East Pakistan cricketers
Cricketers from Lahore
Karachi Whites cricketers
Karachi A cricketers
Punjab (Pakistan) cricketers
National Tyre and Rubber Company cricketers
People from Lahore